The Asō Cabinet governed Japan from 24 September 2008 to 16 September 2009 by Prime Minister Tarō Asō after his predecessor Yasuo Fukuda resigned.

The cabinet resigned after a year in office following the defeat in the 2009 general election, which the opposition Democratic Party won a majority in the House of Representatives.

History

Formation 

The 170th National Diet elected the new Prime Minister on 24 September 2008. As no single party controlled both the houses, the parliament failed to come up with a single candidate: the lower chamber House of Representatives nominated Tarō Asō, Leader of the Liberal Democratic Party, while the upper chamber House of Councillors chose Ichirō Ozawa, Leader of the Democratic Party. With the supremacy of the House of Representatives, Asō was therefore elected. He then announced his cabinet, in a departure from usual practice which Chief Cabinet Secretary gave the announcement.

On the next day, the cabinet agreed on the succession line of the acting premiership, and to return 10% of the ministerial salary to the national treasury as per previous cabinets' decisions.

Call for early election 
The cabinet was formed with Asō's overwhelming support in the party, and was expected to lead the party in another poll. The opposition party called for dissolving the House of Representatives and an early general election. The media also speculated the Prime Minister of what was described as the "acting government" could agree to that.

Tarō Asō reportedly planned to dissolve parliament in October, with a script announcing so was prepared, but the plunge of stock market index in the financial crisis later that month and the drop of approval rate forced Asō to postpone the dissolution.

Decline in support 

The cabinet enjoyed an approval rate of around 50% at the early stage, but sank to 20% in December 2008 according to the opinion polls by Japanese newspapers. With the division in the party, the confidence of Asō commanding the party in the next election had dropped.

The government faced the impact of the financial crisis, which dragged its popularity after the cabinet did not submit the financial budget at an earlier time. But the controversies of Prime Minister mispronouncing words and the abrupt resignation of the two successive former Prime Ministers dealt blows to the ruling party as the public lost the trust to the party. The approval rate of the government further slide to 11% in January 2009.

On 17 February, Shōichi Nakagawa resigned as Minister of Finance after his drowsiness in a press conference of G7 meeting. The support rate of the cabinet bounced back as Ichirō Ozawa was hit by scandals. But after Yukio Hatoyama took over as the leader of the opposition, and Minister for Internal Affairs and Communications Kunio Hatoyama resigned on 12 June over replacement of Japan Post Holdings president, the cabinet was losing support again, falling back into "dangerous situation".

Dissolution of parliament 
Since February 2009, some Liberal Democrats has called for the Prime Minister to resign. The privatisation of postal service further divided the party, with some party senior officials blocking the decisions from Tarō Asō in May, and former high-ranking party member publicly urged Asō to step down.

Tarō Asō finally announced the decision on 13 July 2009 to dissolve the House of Representatives and hold an early general election on 30 August through an unusual notice. A censure motion against the Prime Minister was passed by the upper house on 14 July. Some party members believed the election shall be held in Autumn 2008, while others pondered whether Asō will remain as the Prime Minister even if the Liberal Democrats win the election.

Resignation 
The election on 30 August 2009 saw the disastrous defeat of the Liberal Democratic Party. 6 cabinet ministers lost their re-election bids, and the party lost the majority in the House of Representatives. Tarō Asō announced his resignation at that night. Following their defeat, two cabinet ministers were criticised for giving up the last ministerial duties after being absent from the WTO meeting in September.

On 16 September 2009, Tarō Asō and his cabinet formally resigned in an extraordinary parliament meeting.

Cabinet

Summary 
The average age of the cabinet ministers is 58.2, around four years younger than the previous cabinet. Yūko Obuchi, aged 34 and 9 months when appointed, became the youngest post-WWII minister. Kaoru Yosano was the oldest minister in the cabinet at the age of 70. Five ministers from the last cabinet stayed in office while other five entered the cabinet for the first time. The government was also nicknamed the "hereditary cabinet" as the fathers or grandfathers of four cabinet members had served as the Prime Minister, including Prime Minister himself, Kunio Hatoyama, Hirofumi Nakasone, and Yūko Obuchi.

Departures 
Nariaki Nakayama resigned as Minister of Land, Infrastructure, Transport and Tourism just five days after assuming office over controversial comments. Parliamentary Secretary for the Cabinet Office Kenta Matsunami was sacked in January 2009 after voting abstain for amended budget. Shōichi Nakagawa resigned as Minister of Finance in February. In March, Koichi Hirata resigned as Deputy Minister of Finance for breaching ministerial code. Yoshitada Konoike resigned as Deputy Cabinet Secretary in May over expenses scandal. Minister for Internal Affairs and Communications Kunio Hatoyama resigned on 12 June after president of postal service stayed in office, who was followed by Tōru Toida's resignation as Parliamentary Secretary for Minister of Health, Labour, and Welfare.

Chuko Hayakawa and Yoshihisa Furukawa, who served as Parliamentary Secretary for Minister of Justice and Minister of Environment, also offered to step down after Hatoyama's quit. Both eventually stayed.

Ministers 
The bracket after the party indicates the faction. "Hse" refers to the Houses of National Diet, with "R" as House of Representatives and "C" as House of Councillors.

External links 
 Official list of cabinet ministers (in Japanese)

References 

Cabinet of Japan
Cabinets established in 2008
Cabinets disestablished in 2009
2008 establishments in Japan
2009 disestablishments in Japan